Rebecca Santhosh (born 26 July 1998) is an Indian actress who primarily works in Malayalam television. She is well known for her role as Kavya in the soap opera, Kasthooriman.

Early life 
Rebecca was born on 26 July 1998 in Thrissur, Kerala, India. Her father, Santhosh is a businessman and mother, Jaya is a housewife. She has an elder sister, Geethu. She pursued a BMS degree from St. Teresa's College, Kochi.

Career
Rebecca began her acting career when she was a Grade 4 student through an advertisement. She ventured into mini-screen in 2011 through Kunjikkoonan, a soap opera that premiered on Asianet. She played a lead role, Asin, in the show which revolved around three children eloping during a vacation. In 2012, she portrayed a minor role in Malayalam film Thiruvambadi Thamban.

In 2016, she played the lead role, Anagha, in soap opera Mizhi Randilum, aired on Surya TV. In 2017, she appeared in the horror serial Neermathalam, in which she played Gouri, a ghost. She played a supporting role in the 2017 film  Minnaminungu. She rose into fame playing the lead role, Kavya, in the soap opera Kasthooriman which was aired on Asianet from 2017 to 2021.

In 2019, she hosted a musical reality show, Sa Re Ga Ma Pa Keralam, aired on Zee Keralam. From 2021, she playing the lead role in the soap opera Kaliveedu aired on Surya TV.

Personal life
Rebecca got engaged to film director, Sreejith Vijayan on 14 February 2021. The couple got married on 1 November 2021.

In the media 

She was ranked 8th among the Kochi Times 15 Most Desirable Women on Television 2017 by The Times of India. In, 2020 she earned the 2nd spot in same list.

She was ranked 21st among the Kochi Times 25 Most Desirable Women Of 2018 by The Times of India.

Filmography

Films

Television

Special appearances

Webseries

Awards and nominations

References

External links
 

Living people
Actresses from Thrissur
21st-century Indian actresses
Actresses in Malayalam television
Indian television actresses
1998 births
Actresses in Malayalam cinema
St. Teresa's College alumni